Richard Earl Thomas (born June 13, 1951) is an American actor. He is best known for his leading role as budding author John-Boy Walton in the CBS drama series The Waltons for which he won an Emmy Award. He also received another Emmy nomination and two Golden Globe Award nominations for that role. 

Thomas later starred in the 1990 television mini-series adaptation of Stephen King's epic horror novel It, and played Special Agent Frank Gaad on FX's spy thriller series The Americans. More recently, he appeared in Netflix's Ozark and is touring with To Kill a Mockingbird as Atticus Finch.

Early life and education 
Thomas was born on June 13, 1951 in Manhattan, New York, the son of Barbara Fallis and Richard S. Thomas. His parents were dancers with the New York City Ballet and owned the New York School of Ballet.

Thomas has a nevus on his left cheek. He has stated that this led to his being turned down for a role in a television commercial in his youth.

He was a student at Columbia College, the undergraduate college of Columbia University, where he majored in Chinese before switching to the English department. After he landed the role in The Waltons, he left Columbia during his junior year because he had to commit to the role full-time in Los Angeles.

Acting career

In 1958, at age seven, Thomas made his Broadway debut in Sunrise at Campobello. In 1959, he appeared in the Hallmark Hall of Fame NBC television presentation of Ibsen's A Doll's House with Julie Harris, Christopher Plummer and Hume Cronyn. He then began acting in daytime TV, appearing in soap operas such as The Edge of Night (as Ben Schultz, 1961), A Flame in the Wind and As the World Turns (as Tom Hughes, 1966–67) which were broadcast from his native Manhattan. In 1970, he guest starred in NBC's Bonanza (episode "The Weary Willies").

Thomas' first major film roles were in Winning (1969) with Paul Newman (about auto racing) and Last Summer (also 1969) with Bruce Davison and Barbara Hershey (a summer coming-of-age movie.) 

In 1971, he starred in Red Sky at Morning, and played the lead in Cactus in the Snow (an independent production, considered lost and difficult to acquire through VHS, DVD or any other format).

The Waltons 

Beginning in 1972, Thomas became recognized worldwide for his portrayal of John-Boy Walton in the TV series The Waltons, based on the life story of writer Earl Hamner, Jr.  He appeared in the original CBS television film The Homecoming: A Christmas Story in 1971, which inspired the commissioning of the otherwise largely recast series) and then played the role continuously in 122 episodes. In March of 1977, Thomas left the series and his role was taken over by Robert Wightman. However, Thomas returned to the role in three Waltons TV movies in the 1990s, including A Walton Thanksgiving Reunion in 1993.  Thomas won an Emmy Award for Best Actor in a Dramatic Series in 1973.

Thomas played against type as murderer and rapist Kenneth Kinsolving in You'll Like My Mother in 1972 with Patty Duke. He played the lead roles of Private Henry Fleming in the NBC TV movie The Red Badge of Courage in 1974 and Paul Bäumer in the 1979 CBS TV movie on All Quiet on the Western Front.

In other TV films, he played Col. Warner's younger son Jim in Roots: The Next Generations (the 1979 sequel to 1977's Roots), the title role in the biopic Living Proof: The Hank Williams Jr. Story in 1983, Will Mossup in CBS' Hobson's Choice in 1983, Henry Durie in The Master of Ballantrae for Hallmark Hall of Fame, Martin Campbell in Final Jeopardy and the adult Bill Denbrough in the 1990 television mini-series adaptation of Stephen King's epic horror novel It.

In 1980, Thomas made his first Broadway appearance in more than 12 years when he was a replacement in Lanford Wilson's Fifth of July. In the same year, he appeared as Shad (the young farmer entrusted to employ mercenaries to save his planet from Sador and his invading forces) in Battle Beyond the Stars.

In 1987, he appeared on stage in Philadelphia and Washington, D.C. in the one-man tour-de-force Citizen Tom Paine (playing Paine "like a star-spangled tiger, ferocious about freedom and ready to savage anyone who stands in his way," in a staging of Howard Fast's play set in the bicentennial year of the United States Constitution.) In 1990, he joined with Nathan Lane at the Mark Taper Forum in Los Angeles for Terrence McNally's The Lisbon Traviata in the role of Stephan. In 1993, he played the title role in a Shakespeare Theater stage production of Richard II in Washington, DC.

Thomas starred with Maureen O'Hara and his It co-star Annette O'Toole in the Hallmark Channel movie The Christmas Box in 1995.

Thomas appeared in a quartet of performances at the Hartford Stage in Connecticut including Hamlet (1987), Peer Gynt (1989), Richard III (1994) and Tiny Alice (1996). In 1997 and 1998, he played degenerate Joe Greene in two episodes of Touched by an Angel.

In 2001, he appeared in London's West End in a theatre production of Yasmina Reza's Art with Judd Hirsch. He also appeared on the New York stage in The Public Theater's production in Central Park of As You Like It in 2005, Michael Frayn's Democracy on Broadway in 2004 and the Primary Stages' off-Broadway production of Terrence McNally's The Stendhal Syndrome in the same year.

He hosted the PAX TV series It's a Miracle. He starred in the series Just Cause in 2003 for the PAX TV network. 

In 2006, Thomas began an American theater tour of Reginald Rose's play Twelve Angry Men along with Cheers star George Wendt at the Shubert Theater in New Haven, Connecticut, playing the pivotal role of Juror Eight opposite Wendt's Juror One.

In 2009 and 2010, Thomas was featured on Broadway in Race, a play by David Mamet. The production was directed by Mamet and included James Spader, David Alan Grier and Kerry Washington. In February and March 2011, he starred at the Off-Broadway New York Public Theater in Timon of Athens.

Thomas played Frank Gaad in the FX Network period spy drama television series The Americans which debuted in January 2013.

Thomas appeared in the 2017 Broadway revival of The Little Foxes and was nominated for a 2017 Tony Award for Best Featured Actor in a Play.

In December 2018, Thomas portrayed Ebenezer Scrooge in Pittsburgh CLO's production of A Musical Christmas Carol.

In February 2021, Thomas portrayed Bodie Lord in the Amazon thriller drama television series Tell Me Your Secrets, appearing in episode 5.

In January 2022, Thomas portrayed Wendy Byrde's estranged father, Nathan Davis, in three episodes of season 4 of the Netflix series Ozark.

Starting in April 2022, Thomas starred as Atticus Finch in a National Broadway tour of a stage production of Harper Lee's novel To Kill a Mockingbird.

As of January 2023, Thomas has been credited on Audible for narrating over 340 books.

Personal life
Thomas married Alma Gonzales in 1975. In 1976, they had a son, Richard Francisco. Triplet daughters (Pilar, Barbara, and Gwyneth) were born in 1981. Thomas and Gonzales divorced in 1993.

Thomas married Santa Fe art dealer Georgiana Bischoff on November 20, 1994 and their son, Montana, was born in 1996. Bischoff has two daughters, Brooke and Kendra, from previous marriages. Thomas and Georgiana currently reside in Manhattan, New York. Two of their children (Montana and Kendra) also reside in New York City.

Filmography

Film
Sources: TCM; AllMovie

Television films
Sources: TCM; AllMovie; TV Guide

Television series

Producer
 What Love Sees (1996) (co-producer)
 Summer of Fear (1996) (co-executive producer)
 For All Time (2000) (co-executive producer)
 Camping with Camus (2000) (producer)

Director
 The Waltons (5 episodes)

Awards and nominations

References

External links

 
 
 
 
 Image of Robert L. Jacks, Michael Learned, Richard Thomas and Lee Rich with their Emmys for "The Waltons," Los Angeles, California, 1973. Los Angeles Times Photographic Archive (Collection 1429). UCLA Library Special Collections, Charles E. Young Research Library, University of California, Los Angeles.

1951 births
American male child actors
American male film actors
American male stage actors
American male television actors
Columbia College (New York) alumni
Living people
Outstanding Performance by a Lead Actor in a Drama Series Primetime Emmy Award winners
Male actors from New York City
20th-century American male actors
21st-century American male actors
McBurney School alumni
The Waltons